Robert Edward Mackenzie Dowler (born 1967) is a British Anglican priest. Since September 2016, he has been the Archdeacon of Hastings in the Church of England.

Dowler was educated at Harrow School, Christ Church, Oxford (BA, 1989), Selwyn College, Cambridge (BA, 1993), Westcott House, Cambridge and Durham University (PhD, 2007). He was ordained deacon in 1994, and priest in 1995. After curacies in London including at Christ Church, Southgate he was on the staff of St Stephen's House, Oxford from 2001 until 2009; then Vicar of Clay Hill until his appointment as Archdeacon.

References

1967 births
Living people
People educated at Harrow School
Alumni of Christ Church, Oxford
Alumni of Selwyn College, Cambridge
Alumni of Durham University
Archdeacons of Hastings
Alumni of Westcott House, Cambridge